What a Man or Whatta Man may refer to:

"What a Man" (song), a 1968 song by Linda Lyndell, covered by Salt-n-Pepa and En Vogue
"Whatta Man" (I.O.I song), a 2016 song by I.O.I
What a Man (1930 film), a 1930 American film
What a Man! (1938 film), a 1938 British film
Never Give a Sucker an Even Break (1941 film) known in some foreign releases as What a Man!
Todo un hombre (1943 film), a 1943 Argentine film (What a Man)
What a Man (1944 film), a 1944 American film
What a Man (1983 film), a 1983 Mexican film  (Todo un hombre) starring Vicente Fernández and Amparo Muñoz
What a Man (2011 film), a 2011 German comedy film

See also 
 A Real Man (disambiguation)